Saint-Sardos may refer to:

 Saint Sardos, Bishop Sacerdos of Limoges (d. c. 720)
 Saint-Sardos, Lot-et-Garonne, a commune in France
 Saint-Sardos, Tarn-et-Garonne, a commune in France
 Saint-Sardos VDQS, a French wine classification